Pablo Ignacio González Reyes (born 19 November 1986), also known as Mota, is a Chilean former footballer. He could play as a right midfielder or winger on the same side.

Club career
He has played for clubs in Mexico, Ecuador, Finland and Andorra. On 17 August 2018, González joined FC Lusitanos in Andorra.

International career
He represented Chile U23 at the 2008 Inter Continental Cup in Malaysia, scoring two goals.

Coaching career
González graduated as a football manager in Barcelona, Spain, and then he moved to the United States looking for a chance. He was invited by a Chilean coach, Juan Jara, to Canada and joined an academy as both coach and assistant at different youth levels.

Honours

Club
Universidad de Concepción
 Torneo Clausura (1): Runner-up 2007

References

External links
 
 Pablo González at Football-Lineups
 

1986 births
Living people
People from Santiago
Footballers from Santiago
Chilean footballers
Club Deportivo Universidad Católica footballers
Universidad de Concepción footballers
Ñublense footballers
O'Higgins F.C. footballers
Cobreloa footballers
Deportes Iquique footballers
San Marcos de Arica footballers
Cobresal footballers
Cafetaleros de Chiapas footballers
C.D. Clan Juvenil footballers
Rovaniemen Palloseura players
Deportes Melipilla footballers
FC Lusitanos players
San Antonio Unido footballers
Chilean Primera División players
Ascenso MX players
Ecuadorian Serie A players
Veikkausliiga players
Primera B de Chile players
Primera Divisió players
Segunda División Profesional de Chile players
Expatriate footballers in Mexico
Chilean expatriate sportspeople in Mexico 
Expatriate footballers in Ecuador
Chilean expatriate sportspeople in Ecuador
Expatriate footballers in Finland
Chilean expatriate sportspeople in Finland
Expatriate footballers in Andorra
Chilean expatriate sportspeople in Andorra
Association football midfielders
Chilean football managers
Chilean expatriate football managers
Chilean expatriate sportspeople in Canada
Expatriate soccer managers in Canada